Monologue of Love is a Soviet Ukrainian musical telefilm, written by Grigore Vieru and directed by Larisa Maslyuk, starring Sofia Rotaru in the main role. The movie filmed at Ukretelefilm (Ukrainian Studio of Television Films - Gosteleradio 1986) in Crimea (Ukrainian SSR), Kazakh SSR and Lithuanian SSR, features the new conception in the Soviet musical telefilms: substantial poetry monologues recited by Sofia Rotaru on themes associated with love, followed by thematic songs and corresponding natural geographical and theatrical scenic setting.

Plot 
The conceptual base are the poetic monologues read by Sofia Rotaru playing herself, singer. The monologues were read by Sofia Rotaru in Russian, whereas their author, G. Vieru, has supposedly written them in Romanian beforehand. In between the monologues, adapted music videos appear in all different kinds of scenery from Kazakh desert to Bukovinian rich green villages, passing by beautiful Crimean Black Sea and Lithuanian Baltic Sea shorelines. Sofia Rotaru performs personally in the movie without double stunt performers, namely the role of windsurfer in love, singing the song "Amor" in Romanian language.

Soundtrack 
Sofia Rotaru performed following songs:Echo of Fidelity, Insignificant Event, They Say, Autumn, Night, We - People, "Retro" Machine, Leaves Flew Away, In My House, Amor, The Water Flows, Give Me a Break.

Composers: I. Poklad, David Tukhmanov, A. Morozov, K. Shuaev, Arnold Svyatogorov, G. Tatarchenko, V. Laschyuk, Tatyana Dikareva, Vladimir Matetsky.

Lyrics by authors: Rasul Gamzatov, Yevgeny Yevtushenko, Andrey Voznesensky, Grigore Vieru, Yu. Rybchinskiy, I. Lazarevskiy, M. Ryabinin, V. Bliznichuk, G. Taranenko, Nikolay Rubtsov, V. Laschyuk, A. Saed-Shakh,

Music was performed by ensembles: "Chervona Ruta", "Calendar", "Forum", "Synthesis", "Display", State Pop-Symphonic Orchestra of USSR, group of violin players of the pop-symphonic orchestra of the Ukrainian Television and Radio

Cast
V. Stepanov, Ira Chernyaeva, Lena Sedova, 
students of villages: Rybachy in Kaliningrad Oblast, Nida in Lithuanian SSR. 
Ensemble of pop dances of the Palace of Culture of "Abay", 
actors of puppet theatre in Shevchenko, Fort-Shevchenko in Kazakh SSR, 
Vyzhnytsia in Chernivtsi Oblast, 
Gurzuf in Crimea

Production
Producer: Larisa Maslyuk
Cameraman: Guennadiy Zubanov
Scenario: Grigore Vieru
The music recorded by Vladimir Leshchenko
Responsible for movie production and processing: V. Kozyarevich, Ya. Golovach, K. Petrov, V. Kuznetsov, N. Zachipelenko, I. Bonitenko, B. Sidrochenko, V. Vorobiev, I. Gusev, A. Bilko, A. Makedon, T. Semekha, N. Svetikova, I. Sidorov

References

External links 
Filmography of Sofia Rotaru

1980s Russian-language films
1986 films
Concert films
1980s dance films
Soviet musical films
Ukrainian musical films
Soviet-era Ukrainian films
Ukrainian-language films
Films about entertainers
1980s musical films
1986 multilingual films
Soviet multilingual films
Soviet television films
Ukrainian television films